Mose Khoneli or Moses of Khoni was a 12th-century Georgian writer active during the reign of Queen Tamar ( 1184-1213). He is believed to be author of one of the most important works of medieval Georgian romance and epic poetry Amiran-Darejaniani.

References 

12th-century poets from Georgia (country)
Male poets from Georgia (country)